Drunk Love is an early EP by American rock band The Cab.

Track listing

Later material
The tracks "I'll Run" and "Take My Hand" were re-recorded and included on The Cab's full-length debut album, Whisper War. The track "I'll Run" was also featured as a free download in demo quality on the band's Myspace.

Personnel
 Alexander DeLeon: lead vocals
 Cash Colligan: bass guitar
 Alex T. Marshall: rhythm guitar, piano, backing vocals
 Alex Johnson: drums
 Paul Garcia: lead guitar

References

2006 debut EPs
The Cab albums
Self-released EPs